MK Wolves are an amateur rugby league team based in Milton Keynes, Buckinghamshire.  They compete in the East RL division of the RFL's Regional Leagues.  They train at Emerson Valley Sports Pavilion which also serves as their home pitch, and is also home to Milton Keynes RUFC
(MK RUFC). They are currently ranked club No. 175 by Pitchero.

History 
MK Wolves were founded in early 2012 after members of MK RUFC were keen to play rugby league over the Summer months. They took their nickname from Wolverton which was the original home of Milton Keynes RUFC. MK Wolves found their feet for the initial launch of the club at Emerson Valley Sports Pavilion, which was also home to MK RUFC.

Awareness was, at first, spread by word of mouth, social media, and adverts in the local newspaper (Milton Keynes Citizen). Soon enough, the new club had plenty of prospective players to train with and the club management then set about sourcing sponsors, kits and matches for their future season.

England and Wigan player Sam Tomkins, who was born in Milton Keynes, agreed to become Honorary chairman; which helped to raise the profile of the club in this inaugural year.

Despite the initially hopeful prospects of a successful launch, MK wolves had a fairly turbulent debut opening season.

2012–15 seasons

2012 
The players started to gather together during the evenings of the summer to train. Under the instruction and guidance of Scott Aspinall (Player and coach), they trained together to form a coherent and viable opponent for their looming season. The clubs' first ever match was an away friendly against Hemel Stags 2nd team on Wednesday 25 April 2012 which MK lost 20–6.

Debut competitive match 
MK Wolves' first competitive match was a home game at Emerson Valley against local rivals Bedford Tigers on 5 May 2012, which MK lost 24–40.

Season ending 

A number of subsequent losses meant enthusiasm for the new venture began to wane and, due to a lack of available players, a number of fixtures were cancelled. However, following a rallying cry to finish the season strongly, things started to pick up.

MK's first league points came in a dramatic 24–24 home raw against King's Lynn Black Knights in July, and MK's first ever win came the following week at home against the table-topping St Ives Roosters

MK ended the season bottom of the East League, having played 10, won 1, drawn 1 and lost 8.

2013 

For 2013, MK Wolves welcomed experienced Hemel Stags player (and former Ireland international) Wayne Kelly on board as coach, but after being heavily involved with the club's pre-season preparations, a serious early-season injury from Hemel saw Kelly withdraw and return to his native Northern Ireland with his family.

MK Wolves appointed Abe Kerr as Head coach in replacement of Wayne. Kerr, who had experience with Bedford, hemel, London Skolars, and England Students, had been heavily involved with the clubs' pre-season fitness training.

Spearheading the Buckinghamshire Rugby League Development Association to promote the growth of the sport in the region, MK Wolves also launched an U16s side. They were coached by Gareth Edwards and ran alongside the open-aged 1st Team. U14's training was launched later in the season.

MK Wolves also unveiled a new kit using the colours of white, black and red.

MK Wolves were heavily beaten in the opening game of the season by St Ives Roosters, but rallied to finish fourth (W2 D0 L6) after beating Bedford Tigers and King's Lynn Black Knights to make it to the Play-offs, where they were beaten in the semi-finals by table toppers (and ultimate play-off winners) North Herts Crusaders.  They also made it to the East RL Shield Final, where they were beaten by St Ives Roosters 38–16.

Despite finishing the season empty-handed, 2013 was a much improved season. MK Wolves had a great run for the Shield final, making it to the play-offs, and only one had game dropped throughout the season due to player unavailability.

2014 

2014 started in the best possible way for MK Wolves, with victory in the season-opening East RL 9s tournament – the club's first ever silverware.

Alongside the adults and U16s, MK Wolves RLFC also started running training sessions for U14s and U12s, launched a women's side, and weekly Touch Rugby League sessions in Milton Keynes which offered even more opportunity for people in the region to play Rugby League.

In the league, MK Wolves started with a loss to Bedford Tigers and an emphatic win over Southend Spartans. They also inflicted the first defeat over reigning champions North Herts Crusaders, beating them on their home pitch. It was the Crusaders' first loss in around 2 years.

In the Cup, MK Wolves made it to the Semi-finals where they were beaten by Bedford Tigers.

The following week, in a league match at Bedford, the game was overshadowed by an injury to player-coach Abe Kerr, which necessitated the summoning of the local Air Ambulance.

After the drama at Bedford, the season fizzled out. Bedford Tigers overtook MK Wolves into 4th place to progress to the Play-offs while MK Wolves finished 5th.

2015 
For the 2015 season, the club moved their base to Bletchley, playing at Manor Fields,
Fenny Stratford, the home of Bletchley RUFC.
Given the upheaval of the previous season and moving base, they dropped out of the East RL Premier Division and competed in the Entry League which consists largely of "scratch" games)
They also appointed a new coaching team: Former Bristol Sonics Head Coach Jason Talbot and Mike Stewart – ex-captain of the Championship One side Gloucestershire All Golds, who had played for Castleford Tigers, Batley Bulldogs and Dewsbury Rams, as well as winning two caps for Scotland.
Abe Kerr became Performance Manager, in charge of player fitness.

Teams 
Milton Keynes RLFC boasts 4 main teams and a touch rugby training team.

Milton Keynes RL 1st team

Current squad 
Current Players table to be added

Past Players 
Past Players table to be added

Milton Keynes RL Women's team 
TBC

Milton Keynes RL U16s team 
TBC

Milton Keynes RL U14s team 
TBC

Milton Keynes RL U12s team 
TBC

Honours

See also

Rugby league in Great Britain and Ireland
Rugby league in the United Kingdom

References

English rugby league teams
Rugby league in Buckinghamshire
Sport in Milton Keynes